Chlorophorus boninensis is a species of beetle in the family Cerambycidae. It was described by Kano in 1933.

References

Clytini
Beetles described in 1933